Edward C. Byers Jr. (born August 4, 1979) is a retired United States Navy SEAL who received the Medal of Honor on February 29, 2016, for the rescue of a civilian in Afghanistan in 2012. Byers retired after 21 years of service on September 19, 2019, at the Washington Navy Yard.

Early life and education
Born in Toledo, Ohio, growing up in Grand Rapids, Byers graduated from Otsego High School in Tontogany, Ohio in 1997. He is a Roman Catholic. His father is a World War II Navy veteran. While in his youth, he was a scout in the Boy Scouts of America, achieving the rank of first class.

Naval career
Byers enlisted in the United States Navy in September 1998 and went on to serve as a hospital corpsman. Byers first served at Great Lakes Naval Hospital and was later attached to the 2nd Battalion, 2nd Marines, in 1999 and deployed with the 26th Marine Expeditionary Unit aboard . He attended Basic Underwater Demolition/SEAL training in 2002 and graduated with BUD/S Class 242. In 2003, Byers attended the Special Operations Combat Medic course. He was assigned to his first SEAL team in May 2004.

Byers served 11 overseas deployments, including nine combat tours, deploying multiple times to Iraq and Afghanistan. Over the course of those deployments Byers received four Bronze Star Medals with a valor device, and two Purple Hearts. 

In December 2014, General Martin Dempsey "strongly recommended" Byers for the Medal of Honor. On February 29, 2016, President Barack Obama presented the Medal of Honor to Byers during a ceremony at the White House. Byers is the sixth SEAL to receive the Medal of Honor. Byers was assigned to Naval Special Warfare Development Group, also known as SEAL Team Six, when he was presented the Medal of Honor. Byers is the first member of the unit to receive the Medal of Honor for an action as a unit member. The next month, Byers requested to return to his SEAL team.

In November 2017, Byers was inducted into the Ohio Veterans Hall of Fame. In August 2017, Byers joined fellow Medal of Honor recipient Hershel W. Williams at the launching ceremony for a ship named after Williams. In May 2018, Byers was selected for promotion to master chief petty officer; during that same month Byers was in attendance when Master Chief Special Warfare Operator Britt Slabinski was presented with his Medal of Honor. By July 2018, Byers had received his promotion to master chief.

Medal of Honor action

On December 5, 2012, American physician Dr. Dilip Joseph, who had been working with an aid organization, was captured by the Taliban along with two Afghans while returning to their base in Kabul. The U.S. military gathered intelligence on where Dr. Joseph was being held. The commanders were concerned that the hostages might be moved to a new hideout or killed as early as December 9, 2012.

On the night of December 8, 2012, Byers and his unit were inserted by helicopter in Qarghah'i District of Laghman Province, eastern Afghanistan. They hiked more than four hours over difficult terrain to reach the compound where the Taliban were holding the hostages. Petty Officer 1st Class Nicolas D. Checque sprinted forward, killed the guard and entered the compound, with Byers just steps behind.

Once inside the compound, Checque was shot by a Taliban fighter from within the single room where the hostages were held. Undeterred, Byers burst into the room, shooting dead an armed Taliban fighter. Byers tackled and straddled another insurgent who was scrambling to the corner of the room to get a rifle.  Byers adjusted his night vision goggles to see whether he was the American hostage. When Joseph called out to Byers, Byers killed the insurgent he was straddling and then hurled himself on top of Joseph to protect him from harm. At the same time, Byers pinned another militant to the wall with a hand to the throat until another SEAL shot him.

Byers, the unit's medic, attempted to resuscitate Checque on the ground and during a 40-minute flight to Bagram Airfield without success. Checque was posthumously awarded the Navy Cross for his actions.

Citation

For conspicuous gallantry and intrepidity at the risk of his life above and beyond the call of duty as a Hostage Rescue Force Team Member in Afghanistan in support of Operation ENDURING FREEDOM from 8 to 9 December 2012. As the rescue force approached the target building, an enemy sentry detected them and darted inside to alert his fellow captors. The sentry quickly reemerged, and the lead assaulter attempted to neutralize him. Chief Byers with his team sprinted to the door of the target building. As the primary breacher, Chief Byers stood in the doorway fully exposed to enemy fire while ripping down six layers of heavy blankets fastened to the inside ceiling and walls to clear a path for the rescue force. The first assaulter pushed his way through the blankets, and was mortally wounded by enemy small arms fire from within. Chief Byers, completely aware of the imminent threat, fearlessly rushed into the room and engaged an enemy guard aiming an AK-47 at him. He then tackled another adult male who had darted towards the corner of the room. During the ensuing hand-to-hand struggle, Chief Byers confirmed the man was not the hostage and engaged him. As other rescue team members called out to the hostage, Chief Byers heard a voice respond in English and raced toward it. He jumped atop the American hostage and shielded him from the high volume of fire within the small room. While covering the hostage with his body, Chief Byers immobilized another guard with his bare hands, and restrained the guard until a teammate could eliminate him. His bold and decisive actions under fire saved the lives of the hostage and several of his teammates. By his undaunted courage, intrepid fighting spirit, and unwavering devotion to duty in the face of near certain death, Chief Petty Officer Byers reflected great credit upon himself and upheld the highest traditions of the United States Naval Service.

Awards and decorations

5 gold Service stripes.

While deployed with the 26th MEU, he earned the  Surface Warfare Enlisted badge and the  Fleet Marine Force Enlisted Warfare Specialist device.

Personal life
Byers is a licensed paramedic and attended Norwich University in Northfield, Vermont, finishing his education to receive a Bachelor of Science degree in strategic studies and defense analysis. Byers graduated from Norwich University and is documented as being part of the College of Graduate and Continuing Studies Class of 2016. In February 2017, as a guest of Bob Latta, Byers attended joint session of congress. In May 2017, Byers was an "honored guest" at a SEAL Family Foundation fundraiser in Rancho Santa Fe, California; later that year, he was inducted into the Ohio Military Veterans Hall of Fame. In 2018, Byers announced the creation of a new award, named after himself, at Otsego High School.

In 2021, Byers earned a Master of Business Administration at the Wharton School of the University of Pennsylvania.

Byers is married to Madison and they have one daughter, Hannah.

See also

List of post-Vietnam War Medal of Honor recipients
List of United States Navy SEALs

References

Further reading

External links

1979 births
Living people
United States Navy personnel of the War in Afghanistan (2001–2021)
People from Toledo, Ohio
United States Navy corpsmen
United States Navy Medal of Honor recipients
United States Navy SEALs personnel
War in Afghanistan (2001–2021) recipients of the Medal of Honor
Military personnel from Ohio
People from Wood County, Ohio
Catholics from Ohio